Yun Hyu (Hangul: 윤휴, Hanja: 尹鑴; 1617 – 1680) was a Korean Neo-Confucian scholar and official, who lived during the Joseon Dynasty. Yun was the political leader of the Southern (Namin) faction of the Joseon Dynasty. His pen names were Baekho, Haheon and Yabo.

He was nominated to be a Jipyeong (지평, 持平) as a Yebinshijeong (예빈시정, 禮賓寺正), and had served in various other posts, before he left politics to dedicate himself to scholarly pursuits.

In 1660, he became a leading figure in the controversy regarding the mourning rituals for King Hyojong. In 1674, he became involved again in a second round of the controversy, this time over the death of Queen Inseon.

In 1680, Yun was expelled and exiled to Gapsan (갑산, 甲山). That year, he was ordered to commit suicide by King Sukjong, after a long public debate with Song Si-yeol.

Works 
 Baekhojeonseo (백호전서, 白湖全書)
 Baekhodokseogi (백호독서기, 白湖讀書記)
 Juryeseol (주례설, 周禮說)
 Hongbeomseol (홍범설, 洪範說)
 Jungyongdaehakhuseol (중용대학후설, 中庸大學後說)
 Jungyongseol (중용설, 中庸說)
 Baekhojip (백호집, 白湖集)

See also
List of Korean philosophers
Korean philosophy
Heo Mok
Song Si-yeol
Yun Seon-do
List of Korean-language poets
Korean literature

References

External links 

 Yun Hyu 
 Yun Hyu 

1617 births
1680 deaths
17th-century Korean philosophers
Joseon scholar-officials
Korean Confucianists
Joseon politicians
Neo-Confucian scholars